Cooperstown Township is one of nine townships in Brown County, Illinois, USA.  As of the 2020 census, its population was 264 and it contained 142 housing units.

Geography

Unincorporated towns
 Cooperstown
 La Grange

Cemeteries
The township contains these eleven cemeteries: Cooperstown, Cross Roads, De Witt, Elias Clark, Huffman, Hulett, Logan Creek, Logsdon Number 1, Logsdon Number 2, Perry and Tebo Burial Ground.

Major highways
  US Route 24

Lakes
 Big Lake

Demographics
As of the 2020 census there were 264 people, 170 households, and 107 families residing in the township. The racial makeup of the township was 94.70% White, 0.00% African American, 0.38% Native American, 0.76% Asian, 0.00% Pacific Islander, 0.00% from other races, and 4.17% from two or more races. Hispanic or Latino of any race were 1.52% of the population.

There were 170 households, out of which 9.40% had children under the age of 18 living with them, 62.94% were married couples living together, 0.00% had a female householder with no spouse present, and 37.06% were non-families. 21.20% of all households were made up of individuals, and 21.20% had someone living alone who was 65 years of age or older. The average household size was 2.45 and the average family size was 3.10.

The township's age distribution consisted of 17.3% under the age of 18, 4.6% from 18 to 24, 2.2% from 25 to 44, 49.1% from 45 to 64, and 26.9% who were 65 years of age or older. The median age was 58.2 years. For every 100 females, there were 63.5 males. For every 100 females age 18 and over, there were 71.6 males.

The median income for a household in the township was $78,750, and the median income for a family was $101,641. Males had a median income of $42,917 versus $36,625 for females. The per capita income for the township was $34,185. No families and approximately 7.4% of the population were below the poverty line, including none of those under age 18 and 11.6% of those age 65 or over.

School districts
 Brown County Community Unit School District 1

Political districts
 Illinois' 18th congressional district
 State House District 93
 State Senate District 47

References
 
 United States Census Bureau 2007 TIGER/Line Shapefiles
 United States National Atlas

External links
 City-Data.com
 Illinois State Archives

Townships in Brown County, Illinois
Populated places established in 1853
Townships in Illinois
1853 establishments in Illinois